The World Cricket Classic was a Twenty20 cricket tournament which took place in Bermuda during April 2006. The participating players were all ex-cricketers with the exception of Bermuda who fielded their current squad. Four centuries were made in the tournament, one from Australian Ryan Campbell and South African Steven Jack, while Jack's opening partner Gary Kirsten passed 100 twice.

Squads

Qualifying games

Plate Final

World Cricket Classic Final

External links
Cricinfo

2006 in cricket
International cricket competitions in 2006